The 1995–96 season was Colchester United's 54th season in their history and their fourth consecutive season in the fourth tier of English football, the Third Division. Alongside competing in the Third Division, the club also participated in the FA Cup, the League Cup and the Football League Trophy.

Steve Wignall took his side to the play-offs in his first full season in charge, finishing the campaign in seventh place. They couldn't progress further than the semi-final, after being knocked out over two legs by Neil Warnock's eventual play-off winners Plymouth Argyle.

In the cup competitions, Colchester were eliminated by non-League opposition in the FA Cup at the first round stage with Gravesend & Northfleet vanquishing, while Bristol City also beat Colchester over two legs in the League Cup first round. The U's progressed from their group in the Football League Trophy but were beaten by Peterborough United in the southern section quarter-final.

Season overview
Manager Steve Wignall settled into his first full season in charge by bringing in former fan favourite Tony Adcock during the summer. He also allowed Mark Kinsella to remain with the club on a rolling contract while he harboured ambitions of playing at a higher level.

Colchester slipped up in the FA Cup once again to non-League opposition when Gravesend & Northfleet won 2–0 in the first round. This came after Colchester had already exited the League Cup to Bristol City, also in the first round. The U's reached the area quarter-final of the Football League Trophy but were knocked out by Peterborough United

Boosted by the loan signing of striker Scott McGleish from Peterborough and they rallied for the play-off positions late season. With Joe Dunne scoring an injury time winner at Mansfield Town, Colchester needed a win on the final day of the regular season against Doncaster Rovers to secure a play-off spot. Paul Gibbs' mishit cross looped in to seal a narrow 1–0 victory and a play-off semi-final with Neil Warnock's Plymouth Argyle.

Ahead of the play-offs, Warnock taunted:

Mark Kinsella's long range effort gave Colchester a 1–0 win in the first leg in front of a 6,511 Layer Road crowd to make Warnock eat his words. In the away leg at Home Park, Warnock's squad, assembled for over £1m, took an early lead, before taking an aggregate lead prior to half-time through Chris Leadbitter. Kinsella scored just after the hour mark to level the aggregate score at 2–2 but with the vital away goal, but five minutes from time, Plymouth added a third and denied the U's a second trip to Wembley.

Players

Transfers

In

 Total spending:  ~ £0

Out

 Total incoming:  ~ £0

Loans in

Match details

Third Division

Results round by round

League table

Matches

Football League play-offs

League Cup

Football League Trophy

FA Cup

Squad statistics

Appearances and goals

|-
!colspan="16"|Players who appeared for Colchester who left during the season

|}

Goalscorers

Disciplinary record

Clean sheets
Number of games goalkeepers kept a clean sheet.

Player debuts
Players making their first-team Colchester United debut in a fully competitive match.

See also
List of Colchester United F.C. seasons

References

General
Books

Websites

Specific

1995-96
English football clubs 1995–96 season
1995–96 Football League Third Division by team